Pierluigi Peracchini (born 23 December 1964 in Salò) is an Italian politician.

Peracchini ran as an independent for the office of Mayor of La Spezia at the 2017 Italian local elections, supported by a centre-right coalition. He won and took office on 14 July 2017.

He was elected President of the Province of La Spezia on 28 July 2019.

See also
2017 Italian local elections
2022 Italian local elections
List of mayors of La Spezia

References

External links
 

1964 births
Living people
Mayors of places in Liguria
People from La Spezia
Presidents of the Province of La Spezia